The 2000–01 Primeira Liga was the 67th edition of the top flight of Portuguese football. It started on 19 August 2000 with a match between Braga and Vitória de Guimarães, and ended on 27 May 2001. The league was contested by 18 clubs, with Sporting CP as the defending champions.

Boavista won their first league title, becoming only the second champions from outside the Portuguese "Big Three" (Os Três Grandes) of Benfica, Porto and Sporting, after Belenenses in the 1945–46 season. Boavista qualified for the 2001–02 UEFA Champions League group stage along with Porto, who entered the second qualifying round. Sporting and Marítimo qualified for the 2001–02 UEFA Cup. At the bottom of the table, Campomaiorense, Desportivo das Aves and Estrela da Amadora were relegated to the Segunda Liga. Pena finished as the top scorer with 22 goals. This season saw also Benfica finish sixth, their lowest ever Primeira Liga position.

Promotion and relegation

Teams relegated to Segunda Liga
Vitória de Setúbal
Rio Ave
Santa Clara

Vitória de Setúbal, Rio Ave and Santa Clara were consigned to the Segunda Liga after finishing as the bottom three teams in 1999–2000 season.

Teams promoted from Segunda Liga
Paços de Ferreira
Beira-Mar
Desportivo das Aves

The other three teams were replaced by Paços de Ferreira, Beira-Mar and Desportivo das Aves from the Segunda Liga.

Teams

Stadia and locations

Managerial changes

League table

Results

Top goalscorers

Sources: Footballzz

References

External links
 Portugal 2000-01 – RSSSF (Jorge Miguel Teixeira)
 Portuguese League 2000/01 – footballzz.co.uk
 Portugal – Table of Honor – Soccer Library 

Primeira Liga seasons
Port
1